Regina Cassandra (born 11 December 1988) is an Indian actress who primarily works in Tamil and Telugu films. She made her acting debut with the Tamil film Kanda Naal Mudhal (2005) and made her Telugu film debut with Siva Manasulo Sruthi (2012), for which she won the SIIMA Award for Best Female Debut - Telugu. She made her Hindi film debut with Ek Ladki Ko Dekha Toh Aisa Laga (2019).

Cassandra initially worked in successful films including Routine Love Story (2010), Kedi Billa Killadi Ranga (2013), Power and Pilla Nuvvu Leni Jeevitham both (2014). She received praises for her portrayal of a traditional girl in Subramanyam for Sale (2015), a dental student in Jyo Achyutananda (2016), a youngster in Maanagaram (2017) and a drug addict in Awe (2018). She received SIIMA Award for Best Actress – Telugu nomination for Jyo Achyutananda. Cassandra received SIIMA Award for Best Actor in a Negative Role nomination for her portrayal of a businesswoman in Evaru (2019). Further success came with Silukkuvarupatti Singam (2018), Nenjam Marappathillai, Mughizh both (2021) and Saakini Daakini (2022). She made her web debut with Rocket Boys (2022), for which she received Filmfare OTT Best Supporting Actor - Female nomination.

Cassandra is a CineMAA Awards and a Zee Telugu Apsara Awards recipient. In addition to her acting career, she is a prominent celebrity endorser for brands and products.

Early life
Regina Cassandra was born on 13 December 1988 in Madras (now Chennai), India. Her mother tongue is Tamil.

Career

Debut and Early career (2005-2010)
Cassandra started anchoring when she was nine for Splash, a kids' channel, and then moved on to work in commercials.

Her first feature film appearance was the Tamil film Kanda Naal Mudhal (2005). She later played the lead in the Kannada film Suryakaanti (2010) by director K. M. Chaitanya of Aa Dinagalu fame. The film featured her alongside actor Chetan, and as she could not speak Kannada, she was told to act out scenes in English and add Kannada to it. The film won good reviews and performed moderately at the box office. However, the film's low-key release meant that the film failed to gain attention, so she took time out from films and then went on to graduate in psychology from Women's Christian College, Chennai and took another year off before taking a final call on joining movies.

During her break, Cassandra also acted in several short films, including Balaji Mohan's Kadhalil Sodhappuvadhu Yeppadi alongside Adith Arun, which was later made into a feature film in 2012 under the same name. In 2010, it was announced that she would feature in the Tamil film Maalai Pozhudhin Mayakathilaey alongside Adith Arun, but the film was eventually delayed and then restarted with a fresh cast.

Debut in Telugu cinema, various roles and success (2012-2018)
In 2012, Cassandra appeared in Shiva Manasulo Shruti by Tatineni Sathya, which was a remake of the 2009 Tamil film Siva Manasula Sakthi. She was next seen in the Telugu romantic-comedy, Routine Love Story, alongside Sundeep Kishan, which she signed even before her first release in Telugu.

In 2013 she had two Tamil releases, Kedi Billa Killadi Ranga by Pandiraj, in which she was one of the two lead actresses, and Nirnayam in which she played a vital role. Although the former proved successful at the box office, she did not sign more films in Tamil and instead shifted her focus to Telugu films. Kotha Janta directed by Maruthi was Cassandra's first 2014 release. She received positive response for her performance in the film. Deccan Chronicle wrote, "The star of the film is undoubtedly Regina Cassandra. She looks cute and bubbly and delivers a delightful performance. She has done her character with ease and with the right expressions". Her next releases were Ra Ra... Krishnayya, which saw her reuniting with Sundeep Kishan, and Power in which she played a Bengali girl, the film was a commercial success. She played the lead role opposite Sai Dharam Tej in Pilla Nuvvu Leni Jeevitam directed by AS Ravi Kumar Chowdary.

Seen after two years in Tamil cinema in Rajathandhiram (2015), her acting was praised. Cassandra's next was the successful Subramanyam for Sale and Soukhyam. In 2016, she appeared in the action thriller Shankara (2016), which is remake of the Tamil hit Mouna Guru. She also appeared in the commercially successful film Jyo Achyutananda, receiving critical acclaim for her role.

In 2017, her Tamil films were Maanagaram, Saravanan Irukka Bayamaen and Gemini Ganeshanum Suruli Raajanum. Cassandra In 2018, she appeared in the critical acclaimed Awe and is also part of films like Mr. Chandramouli and Silukkuvarupatti Singam in 2018. The latter was a critical and commercial success.

Further success and recent work (2019-present)
Cassandra's Bollywood debut Ek Ladki Ko Dekha Toh Aisa Laga (2019) had her playing an unconventional role. She states that cinema in general is evolving, and Tamil industry picked up faster in doing unconventional films. In 2019, she received critical acclaim for her role in Evaru. She played a negative character for the first time in 7.

In 2021, she again played a negative role in Chakra and went onto star in Nenjam Marappathillai, Kasada Thapara and the critical success Mughizh all in leading roles. She did a cameo in Thalaivii playing B. Saroja Devi.

Her first release in 2022 is the long-delayed 1945. Cassandra made her web debut with the Sony LIV's series Rocket Boys where she portrays Mrinalini Sarabhai. It received positive reviews from critics. She then had a special number in Chiranjeevi's Acharya.

Cassandra's upcoming movies include Telugu Tamil bilingual Soorpanagai, Telugu films Saakini Daakini and Karungaapiyam. She also has Tamil films Borrder, Party and Kallapart in her kitty. She will appear alongside Vijay Sethupathi in the series Farzi.

Filmography

Films

Web series

Accolades

See also 
 List of Tamil actresses

References

External links
 
 

Living people
Actresses from Chennai
Actresses in Tamil cinema
Actresses in Telugu cinema
Actresses in Kannada cinema
21st-century Indian actresses
Indian film actresses
Women's Christian College, Chennai alumni
South Indian International Movie Awards winners
1990 births